Vincent Paul Dennery November 17, 1916 - August 9, 1989) was an American professional football player who appeared in nine games for the New York Giants of the National Football League in 1941.

References

1916 births
1989 deaths
New York Giants players